Mirati Therapeutics is an American targeted oncology company that focuses on the development of cancer therapeutics.

History
Mirati Therapeutics works largely in KRAS-mutation inhibition, and developing treatments for tumors that contain it. The inhibition to the mutation has shown to shrink the size of its tumors. The company is based in San Diego, California. The company’s name comes from the Italian word for “targeted” (Mirati). Mirati Therapeutics is traded on the NASDAQ under the ticker symbol MRTX. It joined the exchange in 2013.

Drug candidates
The company’s leading drug candidates are sitravatinib and adagrasib. Mirati also has a preclinical candidate against the G12D mutation.

Management
The company’s CEO and President is David Meek.

References

External links
 

Companies listed on the Nasdaq
Biotechnology companies of the United States
Cancer organizations based in the United States
Companies based in San Diego